The 2014 Franken Challenge was a professional tennis tournament played on clay courts. It was the 27th edition of the tournament which was part of the 2014 ATP Challenger Tour. It took place in Fürth, Germany between 2 and 8 June 2014.

Singles main-draw entrants

Seeds

 1 Rankings are as of May 26, 2014.

Other entrants
The following players received wildcards into the singles main draw:
  Johannes Härteis
  Robin Kern
  Kevin Krawietz
  Maximilian Marterer

The following players used protected ranking to gain entry into the singles main draw:
  Iñigo Cervantes Huegun
  Giovanni Lapentti

The following players received entry from the qualifying draw:
  Peter Torebko
  Yannick Maden
  Jason Kubler
  Maximilian Neuchrist

Doubles main-draw entrants

Seeds

 1 Rankings are as of May 26, 2014.

Other entrants
The following pairs received wildcards into the doubles main draw:
  Andriej Kapaś /  Błażej Koniusz
  Johannes Härteis /  Maximilian Marterer
  Steven Moneke /  Peter Torebko

The following pairs used protected ranking to gain entry into the doubles main draw:
  Grégoire Burquier /  Olivier Charroin
  Iñigo Cervantes Huegun /  Steven Diez

Champions

Singles

 Tobias Kamke def.  Iñigo Cervantes Huegun, 6–3, 6–2

Doubles

 Gerard Granollers /  Jordi Samper Montaña def.  Adrián Menéndez Maceiras /  Rubén Ramírez Hidalgo, 7–6(7–1), 6–2

External links
Official Website

Franken Challenge
Franken Challenge
Franken Challenge
Franken Challenge